Thomas Kandolf (born 1 December 1993) is an Austrian handball player for Handball Tirol and the Austrian national team.

He participated at the 2018 European Men's Handball Championship.

References

1993 births
Living people
Sportspeople from Innsbruck
Austrian male handball players